Elijah Cook (born 1835) was a community leader, organizer of schools, and legislator from Montgomery, Alabama. A former slave, he helped establish Montgomery's first school for African Americans in 1865 after the American Civil War. Chose the site for Swayne College in 1868. He also helped bring Lincoln Normal School, predecessor of Alabama State University, to Montgomery from Marion, Alabama. The New York Public Library has a photograph of his home, business, Cook, and his wife from a book published by Chicago publisher Hertel, Jenkins & Co.

Cook was born in Wetumpka. He served in Alabama's General Assembly representing Montgomery County in 1875.

References

1835 births
Members of the Alabama House of Representatives
Date of death missing
American former slaves
People from Montgomery County, Alabama
19th-century American slaves